The women's individual pursuit at the 2006 Commonwealth Games took place on March 19, 2006 at the Vodafone Arena.

Qualification

Finals

Gold medal race

Bronze medal race

External links
 Qualification
 Finals

Track cycling at the 2006 Commonwealth Games
Cycling at the Commonwealth Games – Women's individual pursuit
Comm